The Embassy of Denmark in London, or formally the Royal Danish Embassy, is the diplomatic mission of Denmark in the United Kingdom. It occupies a large, modern building designed by Danish architect Arne Jacobsen which it shares with the Embassy of Iceland, completed in 1977. The Royal Danish Embassy also hosts the Representation of the Faroes in London since 2002.

In 2006 there were protests outside the embassy following the Jyllands-Posten Muhammad cartoons controversy; a number of people were later arrested in connection with the protest.

References

External links

Overview of the building's architecture

Arne Jacobsen buildings
Government buildings completed in 1977
Denmark
London
International style architecture in England
Modernist architecture in London
Denmark–United Kingdom relations
Buildings and structures in the Royal Borough of Kensington and Chelsea
Knightsbridge